C. bidentata may refer to:

 Canna bidentata, a garden plant
 Caprella bidentata, a skeleton shrimp
 Cheirostylis bidentata, a flowering plant
 Chlorodiella bidentata, a crab in which the genital openings are on the sternum in females, but on the legs in males
 Clausilia bidentata, a door snail
 Clivina bidentata, a ground beetle
 Cordulegaster bidentata, a near threatened dragonfly
 Culoptila bidentata, a North American caddisfly
 Cyathea bidentata, a tree fern
 Cyrba bidentata, a jumping spider